The following outline is provided as an overview of and topical guide to the U.S. state of Oregon:

General reference 

 Names
 Common name: Oregon
 Pronunciation:  
 Official name: State of Oregon
 Abbreviations and name codes
 Postal symbol:  OR
 ISO 3166-2 code:  US-OR
 Internet second-level domain:  .or.us
 Nicknames
Beaver State
 Union State
 Pacific Wonderland (previously used on license plates)
 Sunset State
 Adjectivals
 Oregon
 Oregonian
 Demonym: Oregonian

Geography of Oregon 

Geography of Oregon
 Oregon is: a U.S. state, a federal state of the United States of America
 Location
 Northern hemisphere
 Western hemisphere
 Americas
 North America
 Anglo America
 Northern America
 United States of America
 Contiguous United States
 Western United States
 West Coast of the United States
 Northwestern United States
 Pacific Northwest
 Population of Oregon: 3,831,074 (2010 U.S. Census)
 Area of Oregon
 Total  (9th)
 Land:  (10th)
 Water:  (19th)
 Atlas of Oregon

Places in Oregon 

Places in Oregon
 Historic places in Oregon
 Abandoned communities in Oregon
 Ghost towns in Oregon
 Carnegie libraries in Oregon
 National Historic Landmarks in Oregon
 National Register of Historic Places listings in Oregon
 Bridges on the National Register of Historic Places in Oregon
 National Register of Historic Places listings in Oregon
 National Register of Historic Places listings in Clackamas County, Oregon
 National Register of Historic Places listings in Columbia County, Oregon
 National Register of Historic Places listings in Hood River County, Oregon
 National Register of Historic Places listings in Jackson County, Oregon
 National Register of Historic Places listings in Lane County, Oregon
 National Register of Historic Places listings in Marion County, Oregon
 National Register of Historic Places listings in Multnomah County, Oregon
 National Register of Historic Places listings in Wasco County, Oregon
 National Register of Historic Places listings in Washington County, Oregon
 National Register of Historic Places listings in North Portland, Oregon
 National Register of Historic Places listings in Northeast Portland, Oregon
 National Register of Historic Places listings in Northwest Portland, Oregon
 National Register of Historic Places listings in Southeast Portland, Oregon
 National Register of Historic Places listings in Southwest Portland, Oregon
 National Natural Landmarks in Oregon
 State parks in Oregon

Environment of Oregon 

 Climate of Oregon
 Geology of Oregon
 Protected areas in Oregon
 State forests of Oregon
 Superfund sites in Oregon
 Wildlife of Oregon
 Flora of Oregon
 Fauna of Oregon
 Birds of Oregon
 Amphibians and reptiles of Oregon

Natural geographic features of Oregon 

 Beaches of Oregon
 Lakes of Oregon
 Mountains of Oregon
 Rivers of Oregon

Regions of Oregon 

Regions of Oregon
 Central Oregon
 Eastern Oregon
 Southern Oregon
 Southeastern Oregon
 Western Oregon
 Oregon Coast

Administrative divisions of Oregon 

 The 36 counties of the state of Oregon
 Cities in Oregon
 State capital of Oregon: Salem
 Largest city in Oregon: Portland (23rd most populous city in the United States as of July 2006.)
 City nicknames in Oregon
 Unincorporated communities in Oregon
 Census-designated places in Oregon

Demography of Oregon 

Demographics of Oregon

Government and politics of Oregon 

Politics of Oregon
 Form of government: U.S. state government
 United States congressional delegations from Oregon
 Oregon State Capitol
 Elections in Oregon
 Electoral reform in Oregon
 Political party strength in Oregon

Branches of the government of Oregon 

Government of Oregon

Executive branch of the government of Oregon 
 Governor of Oregon
 Lieutenant Governor of Oregon
 Secretary of State of Oregon
 State Treasurer of Oregon
 State departments
 Oregon Department of Transportation

Legislative branch of the government of Oregon 

 Oregon Legislative Assembly (bicameral)
 Upper house: Oregon Senate
 Lower house: Oregon House of Representatives

Judicial branch of the government of Oregon 

Courts of Oregon
 Supreme Court of Oregon

Law and order in Oregon 

Law of Oregon
 Adoption in Oregon
 Cannabis in Oregon
 Capital punishment  in Oregon
 Individuals executed in Oregon
 Constitution of Oregon
 Crime in Oregon
 Gun laws in Oregon
 Law enforcement in Oregon
 Law enforcement agencies in Oregon
 Oregon State Police
 Same-sex marriage in Oregon

Military in Oregon 

 Oregon Air National Guard
 Oregon Army National Guard

History of Oregon 

History of Oregon
Timeline of Oregon history

History of Oregon, by period 
Prehistory of Oregon
Kennewick Man
Marmes Rockshelter
Paisley Caves
Indigenous peoples
Early European exploration, 1565–1818
Juan José Pérez Hernández's northern voyage, 1774
Robert Gray explores and names the Columbia River, 1792
William Robert Broughton's voyage to the Columbia River Gorge, 1792
Lewis and Clark Expedition, 1804–1806
Astor Expedition, 1810–1812
Oregon pioneer history, 1810–1859
Fort Astoria, 1811–1848
 Overton Johnson and William Winter expedition, 1843: 
Oregon Country, 1818–1846
Anglo-American Convention of 1818
Oregon boundary dispute, 1824–1846
Oregon missionaries, 1834–1846
Provisional Government of Oregon, 1843–1848
Oregon Treaty of 1846
Unorganized territory of the United States, 1846–1848
Mexican–American War, April 25, 1846 – February 2, 1848
Treaty of Guadalupe Hidalgo, February 2, 1848
Cayuse War, 1847–1855
Territory of Oregon, 1848–1859
State of Deseret (extralegal), 1849–1850
Anti-Chinese violence in Oregon
Rogue River Wars, 1855–1856
State of Oregon becomes 33rd state admitted to the United States of America on February 14, 1859
American Civil War, April 12, 1861 – May 13, 1865
Oregon in the American Civil War
Nez Perce War, 1877
Spanish–American War, April 25 – August 12, 1898
Crater Lake National Park established on May 22, 1902
Bonneville Dam completed, 1937
Mount Saint Helens eruption of 1980

History of Oregon, by region 

 By city
 History of Eugene, Oregon
 History of Portland, Oregon
 History of Salem, Oregon
 By county
 History of Baker County, Oregon
 History of Benton County, Oregon
 History of Clackamas County, Oregon
 History of Clatsop County, Oregon
 History of Columbia County, Oregon
 History of Coos County, Oregon
 History of Crook County, Oregon
 History of Deschutes County, Oregon
 History of Douglas County, Oregon
 History of Gilliam County, Oregon
 History of Grant County, Oregon
 History of Harney County, Oregon
 History of Hood River County, Oregon
 History of Jackson County, Oregon
 History of Jefferson County, Oregon
 History of Josephine County, Oregon
 History of Klamath County, Oregon
 History of Lake County, Oregon
 History of Lane County, Oregon
 History of Lincoln County, Oregon
 History of Linn County, Oregon
 History of Malheur County, Oregon
 History of Marion County, Oregon
 History of Multnomah County, Oregon
 History of Polk County, Oregon
 History of Sherman County, Oregon
 History of Tillamook County, Oregon
 History of Umatilla County, Oregon
 History of Union County, Oregon
 History of Wallowa County, Oregon
 History of Wasco County, Oregon
 History of Washington County, Oregon
 History of Wheeler County, Oregon
 History of Yamhill County, Oregon

History of Oregon, by subject 
 History of baseball in Portland, Oregon
 History of Oregon State University
 History of Oregon State Beavers football
 History of rail in Oregon
 History of Oregon wine production
 Territorial evolution of Oregon

Culture of Oregon 

Culture of Oregon
 Museums in Oregon
 Religion in Oregon
 The Church of Jesus Christ of Latter-day Saints in Oregon
 Episcopal Diocese of Oregon
 Scouting in Oregon
 State symbols of Oregon
 Flag of the state of Oregon
 Seal of the state of Oregon

The arts in Oregon 
 Music of Oregon

Sports in Oregon 

Sports in Oregon

Economy and infrastructure of Oregon 

Economy of Oregon
 Communications in Oregon
 Newspapers in Oregon
 Radio stations in Oregon
 Television stations in Oregon
 Energy in Oregon
 Power stations in Oregon
 Solar power in Oregon
 Wind power in Oregon
 Health care in Oregon
 Hospitals in Oregon
 Transport in Oregon
 Airports in Oregon
 Rail transport in Oregon
 Roads in Oregon
 State highways in Oregon

Education in Oregon 

Education in Oregon
 Schools in Oregon
 School districts in Oregon
 High schools in Oregon
 Colleges and universities in Oregon
 Oregon State University
 Oregon State University Cascades Campus
 Oregon State University College of Engineering
 Oregon State University College of Science
 Oregon State University Extended Campus
 Oregon State University Foundation
 Oregon State University Historic District
 Oregon State University Marching Band
 Oregon State University Press
 Oregon State University Radiation Center
 University of Oregon
 University of Oregon Bookstore
 University of Oregon Department of Public Safety
 University of Oregon Museum of Natural and Cultural History
 University of Oregon Press
 University of Oregon School of Architecture and Allied Arts
 University of Oregon School of Journalism and Communication
 University of Oregon School of Law
 University of Oregon media
 University of Portland

See also

Topic overview:
Oregon

Index of Oregon-related articles

References

External links 

Oregon
Oregon